Anna Isabel Mulford (1848 – June 16, 1943), was an American botanist and teacher.

Education 
Mulford was born in East Orange, N.J. and graduated Vassar College with an A.B., A.M. in 1886. In St. Louis, Missouri, she enrolled in the Shaw School of Botany at Washington University and in 1895, she was the first student to earn a Ph.D. (a faculty member had done so three years before). Mulford's doctoral dissertation described her research on agave plants in the U.S. In the course of her studies, she discovered several new species and, subsequently, some of them were named after her.

Career 
Mulford discovered Astragalus mulfordiae, which was named in her honor as Mulford's milkvetch.

Her teaching career included both McKinley High School (1898) and St. Louis High School.

Written works
The Agaves of the United States - Mulford's doctoral dissertation, published by the Missouri Botanical Garden in 1896

References

American women botanists
1848 births
1943 deaths
Missouri Botanical Garden people
19th-century American botanists
20th-century American women scientists
20th-century American botanists
Vassar College alumni
Washington University in St. Louis alumni
19th-century American women scientists